Mexilhoeira Grande is a railway station on the Algarve line, which serves Mexilhoeira Grande, in the Portimão municipality, Portugal. It opened on the 30th of July 1922.

References 

Railway stations in Portugal
Railway stations opened in 1922